The results of the 2009 Little League World Series were determined between August 21 and August 30, 2009 in South Williamsport, Pennsylvania. 16 teams were divided into four groups, two with four teams from the United States and two with four international teams each, playing in a round robin format. In each group, the top two teams advanced to the knockout stage. The last remaining team from the United States faced the last remaining international team for the Little League World Series Championship.

Pool Play

Pool A

New York 10, Washington 2

Georgia 11, Iowa 3

Georgia 6, New York 3

Iowa 5, Washington 3

Georgia 3, Washington 2

New York 8, Iowa 3

Pool B

Texas 10, Massachusetts 1

California 15, Kentucky 0

Texas 12, Kentucky 0

California 14, Massachusetts 0

Massachusetts 12, Kentucky 3

Texas 6, California 3

Pool C

Curaçao 2, Venezuela 1

Japan 5, Saudi Arabia 2

Curaçao 12, Japan 11

Japan 5, Venezuela 4

Curaçao 5, Saudi Arabia 3

Saudi Arabia 5, Venezuela 3

Pool D

Taiwan 16, Germany 0

Mexico 2, Canada 1

Taiwan 8, Canada 0

Mexico 13, Germany 0

Canada 14, Germany 13

Mexico 3, Taiwan 2

Elimination round

International Semifinals

Mexico 6, Japan 0

Taiwan 5, Curaçao 2

United States Semifinals

Texas 4, New York 1

California 11, Georgia 10

International Final

Taiwan 9, Mexico 4

United States Final

California 12, Texas 2

Consolation Game

Mexico 5, Texas 4

Championship Game

California 6, Taiwan 3

External links
Full schedule from littleleague.org

2009 Little League World Series